Dr. John D. Horn High School is a secondary school in Mesquite, Texas, United States. The school serves the southern portion of Mesquite and the Mesquite ISD portion of Seagoville.

John Horn High School, which serves grades 9 through 12, is a part of the Mesquite Independent School District. The school is under the UIL AAAAAA (or 6A) division. The Jaguar is the school mascot, and the school colors are red, black and white.

History
John Horn High School is the newest high school opened in the Mesquite Independent School District. It is named after the former superintendent Dr. John D. Horn.

The school opened in 2000 with only 9th and 10th grade classes. The enrollment in that first school year was approximately 550. In the 2006-2007 school year its enrollment was over 2,000 students. Ronnie Pardun was the first principal of the school succeeded by the current principal, Bruce Perkins.

For the 1st time, Horn’s marching band advanced to the UIL State Marching Contest in 2018, in which they placed 22nd, making it the 2nd school in Mesquite to participate in the UIL State Marching competition.

Standard dress
All students at Horn are required to dress according to a standardized dress code (similar to a school uniform) as of 2005 the code is at all Mesquite ISD middle and high schools.

Notable alumni
Quincy Acy, professional basketball player (class of 2008)
Taylor Gabriel, former professional football player (class of 2009)
Jakeem Grant, professional football player currently playing for the Chicago Bears (class of 2011)
De'Vante Harris, former professional football player (class of 2012)
Micah Xavier Johnson, former soldier of the U.S. Army Reserve and perpetrator of the 2016 shooting of Dallas police officers (class of 2009)
JaCorey Shepherd, professional football player currently playing for the San Francisco 49ers (class of 2011)

Notes

External links
Horn High School
MISD School Directory: Horn

Mesquite, Texas
Mesquite Independent School District high schools
2000 establishments in Texas
Educational institutions established in 2000